USS Etlah (YN-98/AN-79) was a  built for the United States Navy during World War II. She was commissioned in April 1945 and spent her entire career in the Pacific Ocean. She was decommissioned in March 1947 and placed in reserve. She was recommissioned in August 1951 for Korean War service and remained active until May 1960. She was sold to the Dominican Republic in September 1976 as patrol vessel Cambiaso (P207). By 1994, Cambiaso had been removed from Dominican Navy service and hulked.

Career
Etlah was launched 16 December 1944 by Commercial Iron Works, Portland, Oregon; sponsored by Mrs. Phyllis I. Kane; and commissioned 16 April 1945. ("Etlah" is apparently a native American Indian word meaning "white lily".)

From 8 June 1945 to 26 November, Etlah sailed out of San Pedro, Los Angeles, California, repairing and maintaining antisubmarine nets, and conducting salvage operations in the 11th Naval District. She then served at the Net Depot, Tiburon, California, testing experimental equipment and giving salvage service in the Oakland Estuary. Following World War II. In the spring and summer of 1946, Etlah performed a miscellany of service to Joint Task Force 1, conducting atomic weapons tests at Bikini Atoll in "Operation Crossroads". The net tender was overhauled at Bremerton, Washington that fall, and on 14 March 1947 was placed out of commission in reserve at Astoria, Oregon.

Etlah was recommissioned 10 August 1951, and after shakedown training, sailed for Yokosuka, Japan, arriving 24 December. Through the remainder of her naval career, she served in the Far East. During the Korean War, she maintained the nets guarding Tokyo Bay, and worked on the nets at Pusan Harbor and Cheju, Korea. Towing ships and targets off Japan and in the Philippines, launching and recovering radio-controlled drones in gunnery exercises, and serving as target ship for submarines and surface ships were Etlahs usual employment until 16 February 1960, when she sailed from Yokosuka for Pearl Harbor and San Diego, California, where she was decommissioned 31 May 1960.

Etlah received two battle stars for Korean War service.

The ship was transferred to the Dominican Republic in 1976, and renamed Cambiaso (P-207). She was decommissioned from Dominican Navy service in the early 1990s, and reduced to a hulk by 1994.

Notes

References 
 
 NavSource Online: Service Ship Photo Archive USS Etlah (AN-79)

Cohoes-class net laying ships
Ships built in Portland, Oregon
1944 ships
World War II net laying ships of the United States
Korean War auxiliary ships of the United States
Cohoes-class net laying ships of the Dominican Navy